This is a list of military equipment used by the Estonian Defence League in the past or present. It includes small arms, artillery, combat vehicles and logistics vehicles. Most of the equipment is received from the Estonian Defence Forces, through the institutions of the Estonian Ministry of Defence or as hand-me-downs from other countries.

Weapons

Vehicles

See also 
List of equipment of the Estonian Defence Forces
List of active Estonian Navy ships
List of Estonian Navy ships
Equipment of the Estonian Air Force
List of historic Estonian Air Force aircraft
Equipment of the Estonian Special Operations Force

References 

Estonian Defence League
Estonian military-related lists
Estonian Defence League